Der Wehrwolf  is a novel by German journalist and writer Hermann Löns, first published in 1910.

Plot summary
The Thirty Years' War is at its height while the peasantry suffers under countless marauders. The protagonist Harm Wulf, a peasant, lost his family in the first years of war; he becomes the defending Wulf (wehrender Wulf) by defending a hill fort and its surrounding carr with peasants hiding from the pillaging hordes. Harm Wulf gathers allies until 121 men are in the Alliance of the Wehrwolf. After peace is restored, Harm Wulf is a grim old man.

Reception
Published in 1910, Der Wehrwolf became a bestseller  in Germany with its nationalist content. Near the end of the Second World War, young Luftwaffenhelfers and children were encouraged to read the novel to promote guerrilla warfare against the Allies (to act like a We(h)rwolf). The novel was indexed after the Allies took power .

See also
Wolfsangel, an emblem used by the protagonist of the book

Notes

References

1910 German novels
1910 German-language novels
Thirty Years' War in popular culture